Ravanoa is a monotypic moth genus of the family Crambidae described by Frederic Moore in 1885. It contains only one species, Ravanoa xiphialis, described by Francis Walker in 1859, which is found in Sri Lanka, Myanmar and on Borneo.

References

External links
Original description by Walker at: 

Pyraustinae
Crambidae genera
Monotypic moth genera
Taxa named by Frederic Moore